Valerie Westheimer is an American bridge player.

Bridge accomplishments

Wins

 North American Bridge Championships (7)
 Machlin Women's Swiss Teams (2) 2000, 2003 
 Sternberg Women's Board-a-Match Teams (2) 2001, 2002 
 Smith Life Master Women's Pairs (1) 2010 
 Wagar Women's Knockout Teams (1) 2012 
 Whitehead Women's Pairs (1) 1998

Runners-up

 North American Bridge Championships (12)
 Machlin Women's Swiss Teams (3) 1997, 2004, 2012 
 Sternberg Women's Board-a-Match Teams (4) 2000, 2003, 2007, 2008 
 Wagar Women's Knockout Teams (3) 2008, 2010, 2011 
 Whitehead Women's Pairs (2) 2007, 2009

Notes

External links
 

American contract bridge players
Living people
Year of birth missing (living people)